Terence Henry "Terry" Hemmings (born 21 September 1936) is a former Australian politician who represented the South Australian House of Assembly seat of Napier for the Labor Party from 1977 to 1993.

Hemmings held the roles of Minister of Housing and Minister of Local Government from 10 November 1982 to 10 February 1984. He replaced these with Minister of Housing and Construction from 10 February 1984 and Minister of Public Works from 19 February 1984. He added Minister of Aboriginal Affairs on 20 April 1989, but lost all ministerial positions on 14 December 1989.

He had previously been the mayor of the City of Elizabeth from 1977 to 1979.

References

1936 births
Living people
Members of the South Australian House of Assembly
Australian Labor Party members of the Parliament of South Australia
Mayors of places in South Australia